Medicine Music is a studio album by Bobby McFerrin, released in 1990. The album reached number 146 on the Billboard 200 and number 2 on the Top Contemporary Jazz Albums chart.

The album was nominated for a 1991 Grammy Award, in the "Best Contemporary Jazz Performance" category.

Production
Voicestra, a 10-member a capella group formed by McFerrin, and Robert McFerrin, Bobby's father, appear on the album. "Common Threads" served as the theme song to the documentary Common Threads: Stories from the Quilt. McFerrin wrote all of the songs on Medicine Music. The lyrics to "Discipline" are based on several verses of the chapter Hebrews 12 from the New Testament, while the lyrics to "The 23rd Psalm" are based on Psalm 23 from the Old Testament.

Critical reception
The Los Angeles Times wrote that "McFerrin sings splendidly, his intonation never faltering as he goes from throbbing bass notes to a soaring, light falsetto." The Austin American-Statesman wrote that "McFerrin's penchant for unusual vocal innovation is present throughout the album, but it is the songs without words, nominally called instrumentals in the McFerrin musical universe, that are the most challenging."

Track listing

All music and lyrics composed by Bobby McFerrin; ©ProbNoblem Music/BMI - except "The 23rd Psalm" (Music: Bobby McFerrin/English text arranged by Bobby McFerrin; ©ProbNoblem Music/BMI)

References

 

1990 albums
1990 soundtrack albums
Bobby McFerrin albums
EMI Records albums
EMI Records soundtracks